Belarus Handball Federation  (Belaruszkaja federacija handbola, BFH) is a national governing body of handball in Belarus.

In reaction to the launch of the 2022 Russian invasion of Ukraine, the European Handball Federation in February 2022 indefinitely suspended Belarusian national and club teams from competitions. The International Handball Federation banned Belarus athletes and officials. Referees, officials, and commission members from Belarus will not be called upon for future activities.

See also 
Belarus men's national handball team
Belarus women's national handball team

References

External links 
Official website

Handball in Belarus
Sports governing bodies in Belarus